The Collectivity of Saint Martin, commonly known as simply Saint Martin, is an overseas collectivity of France in the West Indies in the Caribbean, on – but not identical with –  the island of Saint Martin. Saint Martin is separated from the island of Anguilla by the Anguilla Channel. Its capital is Marigot.

The southern 40% of the island of Saint Martin constitutes Sint Maarten, which has been a constituent country of the Kingdom of the Netherlands since 2010 following the dissolution of Netherlands Antilles. This marks the only place in the world where France borders the Netherlands.

Before 2007, the French part of Saint Martin was a commune belonging to the French overseas department and region of Guadeloupe. Despite seceding from Guadeloupe in 2007 and gaining more autonomy as an overseas collectivity of France, Saint Martin has remained an outermost region of the European Union and is part of the eurozone. For statistical purposes, it is still included in the NUTS 2 (FRY1) and NUTS 3 (FRY10) of Guadeloupe by Eurostat.

Etymology
The island was named by Christopher Columbus in honour of St Martin of Tours because he first sighted it on the saint's feast day on 11 November 1493.

History

Pre-colonial
Saint Martin was inhabited by Amerindian peoples for many centuries, with archaeological evidence pointing to a human presence on the island as early as 2000 BC. These people most likely migrated from South America. The earliest known people were the Arawak who settled there between 800 and 300 BC. Circa 1300-1400 AD, they began to be displaced by hostile groups of Carib people.

Arrival of Europeans

It is commonly believed that Christopher Columbus named the island in honor of Saint Martin of Tours when he encountered it on his second voyage of discovery. However, he actually applied the name to the island now called Nevis when he anchored offshore on 11 November 1493, the feast day of Saint Martin. The confusion of numerous poorly charted small islands in the Leeward Islands meant that this name was accidentally transferred to the island now known as Saint-Martin/Sint Maarten.

Nominally a Spanish territory, the island became the focus of the competing interest of the European powers, notably France and the United Provinces. Meanwhile, the Amerindian population began to decline precipitously, dying from diseases brought by the Europeans.

In 1631, the Dutch built Fort Amsterdam on Saint Martin and the Dutch West India Company began mining salt there. Tensions between the Netherlands and Spain were already high due to the ongoing Eighty Years' War, and in 1633 the Spanish captured St Martin and drove off the Dutch colonists. The Dutch, under Peter Stuyvesant, attempted to regain control in 1644 but were unsuccessful. However, in 1648 the Eighty Years' War ended and the island lost its strategic and economic value to Spain. The Spanish abandoned it and the Dutch returned. The French also began settling, and rather than fight for control of the entire island the two powers agreed to divide it in two with the Treaty of Concordia. The first governor of French Saint Martin was Robert de Longvilliers. Various adjustments to the precise alignment of the border occurred, with the boundary settling at its current position by 1817.

18th–19th centuries 
To work the new cotton, tobacco and sugar plantations the French and Dutch began importing large numbers of African slaves, who soon came to outnumber the Europeans. The French eventually abolished slavery in 1848, followed by the Dutch in 1863 (though after 1848, slavery had scarcely been enforceable as slaves could simply move from the Dutch to the French side of the island). Meanwhile, in 1763, Saint Martin was merged into France's Guadeloupe colony.

20th–21st centuries 
By the first decades of the 20th century Saint Martin's economy was in a poor state, prompting many to emigrate. Things improved during the Second World War as the Americans built an airstrip on the Dutch side of the island.

In 1946 Saint Martin (along with Saint Barthélemy) was formally subsumed as an  into the Guadeloupe . Tourism started expanding from the 1960s–70s onward, eventually becoming the dominant sector of Saint Martin's economy.

Hurricane Luis hit the island in 1995, causing immense destruction and resulting in 12 deaths.

In 2007 Saint Martin was detached from Guadeloupe and became a territorial collectivity with its own Prefect and Territorial Council.

In 2017 Saint Martin was again devastated by a hurricane, Irma, causing widespread destruction across the entire island.

Geography 

The Collectivity of Saint Martin occupies the northern half of the island of Saint Martin in the Leeward Islands; the southern half forms the Dutch territory of Sint Maarten. To the north across the Anguilla Channel lies the British Overseas Territory of Anguilla, to the south-east of the island lies the French island of Saint Barthélemy and further south are the Dutch islands of Saba and Saint Eustatius.

The Terres Basses region lying west of the capital Marigot, which contains the French half of the Simpson Bay Lagoon, is flatter. There are a few small lakes on Saint Martin, such as Chevrise Pond, Great Pond and Red Pond. The land is part of the Leeward Islands xeric scrub ecoregion.

Numerous small islands lie off the coast, including Rock of the Cove Marcel, Creole Rock, Little Key, Pinel Island, Green Cay Grand Islet (within the Simpson Bay Lagoon) and the largest Tintamarre Island.

Hurricane Irma
Hurricane Irma hit Saint Martin on 6 September 2017; 95% of the structures on the French side were damaged or destroyed. Looting or "pillaging" was a problem initially; France subsequently sent 240 gendarmes to help control the situation.

On 11 September President Emmanuel Macron visited St Martin to view the damage and to assure residents of support for relief efforts. At that time, only tourists and visitors from France (mainlanders) had been evacuated from St. Martin, leading to complaints by black and mixed-race residents that whites were being given priority. Macron pledged 50 million euros of aid for the French islands and said the rebuilding will be done quickly but very well. By March 2018 much of the territory's infrastructure was back up and running.

Politics and government 

Saint Martin was for many years a French commune, forming part of Guadeloupe, which is an overseas région and département of France. In 2003 the population of the French part of the island voted in favour of secession from Guadeloupe in order to form a separate overseas collectivity (COM) of France. On 9 February 2007, the French Parliament passed a bill granting COM status to both the French part of Saint Martin and (separately) the neighbouring Saint Barthélemy. The new status took effect on 15 July 2007, once the local assemblies were elected, with the second round of the vote ultimately occurring on 15 July 2007. Saint Martin remains part of the European Union.

The new governance structure befitting an overseas collectivity took effect on 15 July 2007 with the first session of the Territorial Council. This is a unicameral body of 23 members, with elections held every five years. On 7 August, Frantz Gumbs was elected as President of the Territorial Council. However, his election was declared invalid on 10 April 2009 and Daniel Gibbs appointed as Acting President of the Territorial Council on 14 April 2009. Gumbs was re-elected on 5 May 2009.

The Chief of State is the President of France (currently Emmanuel Macron), who is represented locally by a Prefect appointed by him/her on the advice of the Minister of the Interior (France). The current Prefect is Sylvie Feucher. Saint Martin elects one member to the French Senate, and one to the French National Assembly (note that the latter post is shared with Saint Barthélemy).

Before 2007, Saint Martin was coded as GP (Guadeloupe) in ISO 3166-1. In October 2007, it received the ISO 3166-1 code MF (alpha-2 code), MAF (alpha-3 code), and 663 (numeric code).

There currently exists a movement in Saint Martin aiming for the unification of island of Saint Martin, which has its own flag.

Demographics 
At the Jan. 2017 French census the population was 35,334 (up from only 8,072 inhabitants at the 1982 census). The population decrease between January 2017 and January 2019 is due to Hurricane Irma which affected Saint Martin in early September 2017 and destroyed most of the territory's infrastructure.

Most residents live on the coastal region in the towns of Marigot (the capital), Grand-Case and Quartier-d'Orleans. Most residents are of black or mixed Creole ancestry, with smaller numbers of Europeans and Indians.

French is the official language of the territory. Other languages spoken include English, Dutch, Papiamento and Spanish. A local English-based dialect is spoken in informal situations on both the French and Dutch sides of the island. The sizable Haitian community (7,000 in 2000) also use Haitian Creole.

The main religions are Roman Catholicism, Jehovah's Witnesses, various Protestant denominations, Hinduism and Islam.

Education 
The collectivity has the following public preschool, primary, and elementary schools:
 Preschools: Jean Anselme, Jérôme Beaupère, Elaine Clarke, Evelina Halley, Ghyslaine Rogers, Trott Simeone
 Primary schools: Omer Arrondell, Émile Choisy, Nina Duverly, Elie Gibs, Aline Hanson, Émile Larmonnie, Marie-Amélie Ledee, Clair Saint-Maximin, Hervé Williams
  M-Antoinette Richard

There are three junior high schools and one senior high school:
 Junior highs: #1 , #2 , #3 
 Lycée Professionnel des Îles Nord (senior high/sixth-form)
 Cité Scolaire Robert Weinum is a joint public junior-senior high school in Saint Martin

Religion 
The majority of the inhabitants of the island of St. Martin profess Christianity, in the French part the Catholic Church is the majority. There are also other Christian groups and other religions.

The French territory of St. Martin is part of the Diocese of Basse-Terre and Pointe-à-Pitre (in Latin, Dioecesis Imae Telluris and in French, Diocèse de Basse-Terre et Pointe-à-Pitre), attached to the organization of the Catholic Church in France. The diocese includes the territories of Guadeloupe, St. Barthélemy and St. Martin. This diocese is part of the ecclesiastical province of Fort-de-France, in the ecclesiastical region of the Antilles, and has as neighbors to the northwest, the diocese of Saint John-Basseterre and to the southeast, the diocese of Roseau.

About sixty priests are active in the diocese and serve several churches, among them the Church of Saint Martin de Tours (Saint-Martin-de-Tours) in Marigot, the Church of Mary Star of the Sea (Église de Marie Etoile de la Mer) in Grand Case and the Church of Saint Martin in Quartier d'Orléans (Église de Saint-Martin).

The episcopal see is located in Basse-Terre, city of Guadeloupe, with the cathedral of Our Lady of Guadeloupe as the main or mother church, (cathédrale Notre-Dame-de-Guadeloupe).

Economy 

 

As a part of France, the official currency of Saint Martin is the euro, though the US dollar is also widely accepted. Tourism is the main economic activity – with over one million visitors annually some 85% of the population is employed in this sector. The other major sector is the financial services industry. Though limited, agriculture and fishing are also practiced, though these sectors are very small and most food is imported.

INSEE estimated that the nominal GDP of Saint Martin amounted to 581.8 million euros in 2014 (US$771.9 million at 2014 exchanges rates; US$660.3 million at Feb. 2022 exchange rates). In that same year the nominal GDP per capita of Saint Martin was 16,572 euros (US$21,987 at 2014 exchanges rates; US$18,806 at Feb. 2022 exchange rates), which was only half the GDP per capita of metropolitan France in 2014, and 79% of Guadeloupe's GDP per capita. In comparison, the nominal GDP per capita on the Dutch side of the island, Sint Maarten, was US$33,536 in 2014.

Newspapers 
The following newspapers are published in Saint Martin:

 Le Pelican
 Faxinfo
 SXMInfo.fr
 Soualiga Post
 St. Martin's Week
 St. Martin News Network (also covers Sint Maarten)

Transport 

Saint Martin has one airport, Grand Case-Espérance Airport, which provides flights to Guadeloupe, Martinique and Saint Barthélemy. For international tourists Saint Martin relies on Princess Juliana International Airport on the Dutch side of the island.

See also
 Culture of Saint Martin
 Economy of Saint Martin
 History of Saint Martin
 List of divided islands

References

External links 

 Official website of the Collectivity of Saint Martin 
 Official website of the Tourist Office of Saint Martin
 
 
 Saint Martin. The World Factbook. Central Intelligence Agency.

 
Saint Martin (island)
Saint Martin, Collectivity of
Dependent territories in the Caribbean
French Caribbean
Saint Martin
Outermost regions of the European Union
French-speaking countries and territories
Former dependencies of Guadeloupe
States and territories established in 2007
2007 establishments in France
2007 establishments in North America